Stephen Barclay (20 November 1918, in Baltimore – 2 February 1994, in Rome) was an American film actor known for his work in Italy. He became a leading man in Italian films after working in numerous Westerns in Hollywood. He was married to actress Lyla Rocco (1954–1964) and later to former Miss France, Lisa Simon (née Liliane Czajka; 1935–2020).

Selected filmography
 Vigilantes of Dodge City (1944)
 Girls of the Big House (1945)
 A Sporting Chance (1945)
 Don't Fence Me In (1945)
 Landrush (1946)
 Sicilian Uprising (1949)
 The Beggar's Daughter (1950)
 The Black Captain (1951)
 Operation Mitra (1951)
 Noi peccatori (1953)
 Finishing School (1953)
 Woman of the Red Sea (1953)
 Nero and the Burning of Rome (1953)
 The Three Musketeers (1953)
 The Knight of the Black Sword (1956)

References

Bibliography 
 Goble, Alan. The Complete Index to Literary Sources in Film. Walter de Gruyter, 1999.

External links 
 

1918 births
1994 deaths
American emigrants to Italy
Male actors from Baltimore
20th-century American male actors